Propanephosphonic acid anhydride (PPAA, T3P) is an anhydride of propanephosphonic acid. Its structure is a cyclic trimer, with a phosphorus–oxygen core and propyl groups and additional oxygens attached.  The chemical is a useful reagent for peptide synthesis reactions, where it activates the carboxylic acid partner for subsequent reaction with amines. It is commercially available as 50 % solution in DMF or ethyl acetate as a slightly yellow mixture.

References 

Reagents for organic chemistry
Phosphonates